The Eastern Tornadoes were a New Zealand rugby league franchise that competed in the New Zealand Rugby League's Bartercard Cup and Auckland Rugby League's Super 12 competitions. They were formed to represent the rugby league clubs of East Auckland.

History
The Eastern Tornadoes were formed in 1999 to compete in the Auckland Rugby League's Super 12 competition. They were a merger of the Mt Wellington, Otara and Pakuranga senior sides.

In 2000 they joined the new national Bartercard Cup competition. The team originally included players from the Ellerslie Eagles but in 2004 they joined the Otahuhu Leopards to form the Otahuhu Ellerslie Leopards, being replaced by the Manurewa Marlins. In 2006 the competition was revamped and they were merged with the Otahuhu Ellerslie Leopards to form the Tamaki Leopards.

Notable players

Notable players included: Jeremiah Pai, Gary Tupou, Herewini Rangi, Zebastian Lucky Luisi, David and Paul Fisiiahi and Hare Te Rangi.

They were coached by James Leuluai.

Bartercard Cup
The team was always a force in the early years, losing the Grand Final in 2001. However, in 2004 and 2005 the club was a shadow of its former self and failed to qualify for the playoffs.

*Two points for a bye awarded as the Ngongotaha Chiefs left the competition.

References

Auckland rugby league clubs
Rugby clubs established in 1999
Defunct rugby league teams in New Zealand
Mount Wellington Warriors
1999 establishments in New Zealand
2006 disestablishments in New Zealand
Sports clubs disestablished in 2006